Safety standards are standards designed to ensure the safety of products, activities and processes, etc. They may be advisory or compulsory and are normally laid down by an advisory or regulatory body that may be either voluntary or statutory. In October 2021, a fire raging through multiple floors of a diplated apartment block in Kaoshiung highlighted the lax standards in Taiwan. China has recently experienced trouble with some of the post listed associations.

Acts
Canada Consumer Product Safety Act
U.S. Consumer Product Safety Act

See also
 Consumer protection
 Bicycle safety
 China compulsory certification
 Injury prevention
 Public administration
 Road safety
 Standards organization
 Testing organizations
 Baseefa (UK)
 Canadian Standards Association (Canada)
 Technischer Überwachungsverein (Germany, UK, China & USA)
 Underwriters Laboratories (USA)
 Toy safety
 Safety by design

References

Safety codes